Alan Banks (born 5 October 1938) is an English former professional footballer who played for Liverpool, Cambridge City, Exeter City, Plymouth Argyle and Poole Town.

Exeter City paid out a club record fee to obtain his transfer in November 1963.

External links

 LFChistory.net player profile
 

1938 births
Living people
English footballers
Liverpool F.C. players
Cambridge City F.C. players
Exeter City F.C. players
Plymouth Argyle F.C. players
Poole Town F.C. players
Association football forwards
English Football League players
Footballers from Liverpool